First Brother Island is an island on the Ohio River along the shores of the city of Belmont in Pleasants County, West Virginia, USA. French Creek empties into the Ohio on its eastern end. First Brother Island contains a number of operating oil wells.

See also 
List of islands of West Virginia
 Brother Island for other islands named "Brother"

River islands of West Virginia
Islands of Pleasants County, West Virginia
Islands of the Ohio River